Putnanja is a 1995 Kannada language film directed by Ravichandran and produced by A. Narsimhan. This film stars Ravichandran, Meena, Umashri, Lokesh in lead roles. Music was composed by Hamsalekha. The film's plot was inspired by the 1972 Tamil movie Pattikada Pattanama.

Plot
This film depicts the story of a farmer named "Putnanja", living with his grandmother, Putmalli, near Nanjangud town in Mysore district. Putnanja was a man respected by everyone in the village and was well-known to all for his kindness towards poor and backward. When Putnanja hears a news regarding arrival of Roja to India (who went to America for studies during childhood and whom Putnanja likes and wants to marry) he rushes towards her place to propose her to marry him. When Putnanja goes and proposes her, she does not even recognize him, and suggests not to talk about their marriage in future days. Putnanja's mother-in-law wants her daughter Roja to marry a rich, educated person and hence opposes Putnanja's proposal, but his father-in-law wants her daughter to marry him since he is kind and good. But he can't do anything he wants since he would be working as a slave to his wife.

Once Putnanja proposes Roja's family to come to their village festival and spend some days with them, Taara refuses to go, but due to her daughter's stubborn she accepts to go to their village. Roja likes the tour very much and she even starts liking Ravichandran due to his kindness towards people. After returning to the city Lokesh manages to convince Roja to marry Putnanja, despite her mother's opposition. As day passes Roja tries to enjoy life in village in the city manner neglecting all the rules that has to be followed in the village and one day she reaches above limit range by burning the plouge which is treated as god by the villagers. Then Putnanja slaps her for performing this event which makes Roja to leave the village. One day she realises that she is going to give birth to a child and she decides to take care of the child without any help from Putnanja. As soon as she gives birth to a child, Putmalli takes the child and goes to her village. When Roja realizes that she can't live without Putnanja and her child she rushes towards his village and they then lead a happy life together.

Box office

The film ran for more than 25 weeks and declared a blockbuster.

Cast
 Ravichandran as Putnanja
 Meena as Roja
 Umashri as Putmalli
 Lokesh as Putnanja's father-in-law
 Satyajith
 Kavitha_(actress)
 Pooja Lokesh

Soundtrack

Hamsalekha wrote the lyrics and composed all the songs in the film. The album has eight soundtracks.

Awards
Umashri won the filmfare award for best supporting actress for her role as "Putmalli".

References

1990s Kannada-language films
1995 films
Indian drama films
Films scored by Hamsalekha
Films directed by V. Ravichandran
Kannada remakes of Tamil films